The Quest is a 1984 fantasy role-playing game supplement published by Icarus Games.

Contents
The Quest is a book about how to design question scenarios, and deals with the heroic quest in terms suitable for any fantasy roleplaying game.

Reception
David Dunham reviewed The Quest in Space Gamer No. 71. Dunham commented that "This is a unique book; I know of no other which assists in scenario design.  It covers its subject matter well.  While by its very nature its use is limited, I recommend it as a good way to bring serious quests into an FRP campaign."

References

Fantasy role-playing game supplements
Role-playing game supplements introduced in 1984